Strumica Fortress also known as the Czar's Towers is a ruined fortress in eastern Macedonia. It overlooks the city of Strumica. The fortress was built in the 5th century, although the site itself dates from the 1st century BC.

Reconstruction of the fortress began in March, 2014.

See also 
List of castles in North Macedonia

References

Geography of North Macedonia
Castles in North Macedonia
Buildings and structures in Strumica